List of Derry City players.

Club captains

Notable former players

Reserve and youth squads
Derry City currently has academy teams at u13, u15, u17 and u19 age groups as well as an under-21 reserve team who play in the Ulster Senior League. These teams have also competed in international youth tournaments, including the Foyle Cup and the Umbro Galway Cup. In 2006, the academy team was victorious in the Umbro Galway Cup. Although many youth players come from the local youth league, the Derry and District League, Derry have branched out their scouting network and have since promoted players from all around Ireland.

Derry's under-21 side finished 3rd in the 2006 Dr. Tony O'Neill League Northern Section and therefore qualified for the knock-out stages, contested between qualifiers from the four provincial sections. In the second round, the side met Shelbourne F.C.'s under-21 team and knocked them out, winning 3-1. However, the side was then beaten in the quarter-final by the under-21 team of Sligo Rovers F.C.

Record appearances in the League of Ireland

Senior international players to have played for Derry City

References

 
Players
Association football player non-biographical articles
Derry City